Charles Garland Robinette (born August 21, 1943 in Boutte, Louisiana) is a journalist in the New Orleans area. He was recently the host of "The Think Tank" on New Orleans radio station WWL (AM).

Robinette was a news anchor and investigative reporter on New Orleans TV station WWL-TV Channel 4 for twenty years (August 1970 until August 8, 1990). After leaving the TV station, Robinette served as head of public relations for Freeport-McMoRan in New Orleans before starting his own firm. He returned to the media in 2005 on WWL (AM) as a fill-in for David Tyree, a popular host stricken with cancer. The position became permanent when Tyree succumbed several weeks after Hurricane Katrina.

Radio show 
Robinette came to national attention with Hurricane Katrina in 2005. As the storm made landfall radio station WWL was the only broadcast media in New Orleans able to continue operating during the disaster. Robinette was broadcasting from a hastily thrown together set-up in a closet  of the WWL studios after the high rise building windows blew out. In the days between the time when the hurricane hit New Orleans and when outside help arrived, Robinette's broadcasts were an important information source for those able to hear radio broadcasts in the Greater New Orleans area. On September 2, 2005, Robinette conducted the famous interview with Mayor Ray Nagin where the mayor urged those in the Federal Government who had been promising but not delivering aid to "get off your asses".

Robinette is one of the interview subjects in When the Levees Broke, the 2006 Spike Lee documentary about the effect of Hurricane Katrina on New Orleans. He also appears alongside Angela Hill, his former coanchor and ex-wife, in Hexing A Hurricane, a documentary about the first six months in New Orleans after Hurricane Katrina.

Garland Robinette retired from WWL radio in July 2017 after a 12-year run, to focus on painting.

Trivia 
 Robinette, a native of the Louisiana bayou country and Hahnville High School alum, is a U.S. Navy veteran of the Vietnam War.
 In 1988, Robinette was caught attempting to enter the Republican National Convention, which was held in the Louisiana Superdome, with a concealed firearm in his briefcase.
 Robinette is also an artist—known particularly for his portraits. He studied at the New Orleans Academy of Fine Arts and created the official poster for the 2011 New Orleans Jazz and Heritage Festival.
 On his radio show on 25 October 2006, Robinette advocated the use of nuclear weapons in an attempt to end the Iraq War.
 On his radio show on 28 May 2008, Robinette vigorously defended his position that, just like a janitor, the President of the United States needs no experience and can rely on experts and training in this position.
 When they were husband and wife for 9 years (1978–1987), Robinette and Angela Hill were paired. (Hill retired from the anchor desk in April 2013.)
 His last name means, roughly, "little bright fame," ironic considering that he became very famous after Hurricane Katrina.
 Sometimes mistakenly called "Robin Garlanett", and jokingly refers to himself by using this moniker at times.
 Robinette and Hill were collectively referred to as "Garangela the two-headed monster" by local talk show wag, Dennis Williams during his tenure (1982–1987) on WSMB-AM and later WNOE-AM both rival radio stations at the time to WWL-AM.
 Robinette humorously refers to Democrats as "Dema-don'ts" & Republicans as "Republican'ts" and both as "Fear Clubs". He uses both these terms in the same sentence during a live CNN Anderson Cooper broadcast on 6/15/10 in making a point about the BP Gulf Oil Spill.
 On 2010 October 22 Robinette's Think Tank became the first media outlet to mention lieutenant governor candidate Caroline Fayard as a potential Democrat alternative to Republican governor Bobby Jindal should Jindal seek reelection in 2011.

References

External links 
 Transcript of Robinette/Nagin interview
 www.robinettestudios.com

Living people
People from St. Charles Parish, Louisiana
American talk radio hosts
American television journalists
Television anchors from New Orleans
American male journalists
1943 births